State Route 602 in Fairfax County, Virginia is a secondary state highway which traverses the northwestern portion of the county. SR 602 is the main road through Reston, and connects with SR 608 (West Ox Road), SR 267 (Dulles Toll Road and Dulles Access Road), SR 606 (Baron Cameron Avenue), and SR 7 (Leesburg Pike). All these connections provide ample commuting opportunities for the residents of Reston and the residents of neighboring areas.

Route description 

SR 602 uses three different names: Lawyers Road, Reston Parkway, and Seneca Road. There are also two short concurrencies: one with SR 7 (Leesburg Pike) and the other with SR 193 (Georgetown Pike).

Lawyers Road
SR 602 as Lawyers Road is a southern spur of SR 673, Lawyers Road, which forms the southern boundary of Reston and heads east into Vienna. This section of SR 602 is a four-lane divided road that travels northward between subdivisions of single-family homes.

Reston Parkway
At the intersection where Lawyers Road turns east as SR 673, SR 602 continues north as Reston Parkway. This road serves as the Main Street of busy Reston. It first passes SR 5320, Sunrise Valley Drive, which, to the east, is the address of many office buildings. It then passes SR 267, the Dulles Airport Access and Toll Roads, which lead to Dulles Airport, Leesburg, and Washington, D.C. via Interstate 66. The next major road that is passed is SR 675, Sunset Hills Road. This road goes to Herndon to the west, and many retail stores and offices to the east.

Traveling further north, one passes the Reston Town Center to the west, followed by many different retail and office centers. Reston Parkway then passes SR 606 (Baron Cameron Avenue), a major connector between Loudoun County and SR 7 (Leesburg Pike) toward Washington, D.C. The road continues through shopping centers and developments of single-family homes until it intersects with SR 7 (Leesburg Pike).

Seneca Road
After short concurrencies with SR 7 (Leesburg Pike) and SR 193 (Georgetown Pike), SR 602 continues north as Seneca Road, a two-lane road. This road is the westernmost north–south route in Great Falls that intersects with a primary state route, and so it is well traveled during commuting hours rush hour. The road passes by developments of large single-family homes, and the route ends at the Loudoun County border.  It is considered a suburb of Great Falls. As Seneca Road continues into Loudoun County, it becomes a private road that serves only Lowes Island (Golf) Club.  As well as hitting the Golf club the road hits the entrance of the Great Falls park.

History
The portion of Reston Parkway the goes between Lawyers Road and Baron Cameron Avenue was originally Reston Avenue, a two-lane road (Reston Parkway is now 4 lanes in all places). North of Baron Cameron Avenue one can still find a part of the original Reston Avenue, as the northern part of Reston Parkway was aligned differently from Reston Avenue. This part of Reston Avenue was given the designation SR 7917.

Major intersections

References

602 Fairfax
State Route 602
State Route 602